Offshore structure may refer to:

 Offshore financial centre
 Offshore company
 Offshore partnership
 Offshore trust
 offshore construction